The Gomai River in India is a tributary of the Tapti River. It originates in the Satpura Mountain Range and merges with the Tapti River around 2 km east of Prakasha. The Gomai River itself has many small tributary rivers, including the Susri River (passing by Sultanpur), the Tipria River (passing by Mandane), the Umri River, and the Sukhi River.

Gallery

See also

List of rivers of India
Rivers of India

External links

References

Rivers of Maharashtra
Tributaries of the Tapti River
Rivers of India